Table Bluff may refer to:
Table Bluff (California), geologic feature
Table Bluff, California, unincorporated community
Table Bluff Rancheria, Wiyot reservation
Table Bluff Reservation--Wiyot Tribe, Native American tribe
Table Bluff Light, lighthouse